Grant Creek is a stream in Beltrami County, Minnesota, in the United States.

Grant Creek was likely named for a pioneer lumberman.

See also
List of rivers of Minnesota

References

Rivers of Minnesota
Rivers of Beltrami County, Minnesota